Bakota may refer to:

Places
 Bakota, Ukraine, a former settlement on the banks of the Dniester
 Bakota Bay, on the above site
 Bakota region (West Africa), home of Ewale a Mbedi in oral histories of Sawa ethnic groups

People
 Božo Bakota (born 1950), Croatian footballer
 Kota people (Gabon), an African Bantu tribe